Bastian Kurz (born 23 September 1996) is a German footballer who plays as a midfielder for TSV Schwaben Augsburg in the Bayernliga.

References

External links
 
 

1996 births
Living people
People from Altötting (district)
Sportspeople from Upper Bavaria
German footballers
Association football midfielders
FC Augsburg II players
FC Rot-Weiß Erfurt players
Kickers Offenbach players
Regionalliga players
3. Liga players
Footballers from Bavaria
TSV Schwaben Augsburg players